Hoher See is a lake in the Vorpommern-Greifswald district in Mecklenburg-Vorpommern, Germany. At an elevation of 10.8 m, its surface area is 0.102 km².

Lakes of Mecklenburg-Western Pomerania